Lestes curvatus is a species of spreadwing in the damselfly family Lestidae.

The IUCN conservation status of Lestes curvatus is "LC", least concern, with no immediate threat to the species' survival. The IUCN status was reviewed in 2009.

References

Further reading

 

Lestes
Articles created by Qbugbot
Insects described in 1997